The South Shields, Marsden, and Whitburn Colliery Railway was a Whitburn Coal Company built twin track branch railway line that ran along the North Sea coast in County Durham, England, from  in South Shields to Whitburn Colliery at Marsden via two intermediate stations,  station (renamed Marsden in 1926), and Marsden (which closed in 1926).

History

Opening
The line was built in the late 1870s without an Act of Parliament to serve the newly constructed Whitburn Colliery and was opened as a private railway in May 1879. Apart from the colliery and those working there the line served the Lighthouse limestone quarry, a paper manufactory, and local farms. The line opened to the public on 19 March 1888.

Nationalisation
On 1 January 1947 the coal company was vested in the National Coal Board so the railway became the first nationalised passenger line in Britain. (Most of the railways in Britain were nationalised on 1 January 1948 under the terms of the Transport Act 1947).

Closure

Passenger service was officially withdrawn on 14 November 1953, but trains ran until 23 November. The majority of the line closed to freight with the Whitburn Colliery on 8 June 1968 although the section running through  to Westoe Colliery remained open until 1993.

References

External links
Whitburn Colliery history
Line on a 1947 OS Map

Closed railway lines in North East England
Rail transport in County Durham
Railway lines opened in 1879
Railway lines closed in 1968
Transport in South Shields
March 1888 events
January 1947 events in the United Kingdom
November 1953 events in the United Kingdom